Merrilands is a suburb of New Plymouth, in the western North Island of New Zealand. It is located to the south-east of the city centre. The Waiwhakaiho River runs past Merrilands to the east, and Te Henui Stream runs past to the west.

Demographics

Merrilands had a population of 2,925 at the 2018 New Zealand census, an increase of 114 people (4.1%) since the 2013 census, and an increase of 138 people (5.0%) since the 2006 census. There were 1,182 households, comprising 1,404 males and 1,521 females, giving a sex ratio of 0.92 males per female. The median age was 42.8 years (compared with 37.4 years nationally), with 540 people (18.5%) aged under 15 years, 501 (17.1%) aged 15 to 29, 1,236 (42.3%) aged 30 to 64, and 642 (21.9%) aged 65 or older.

Ethnicities were 83.6% European/Pākehā, 14.7% Māori, 2.2% Pacific peoples, 7.3% Asian, and 2.4% other ethnicities. People may identify with more than one ethnicity.

The percentage of people born overseas was 18.4, compared with 27.1% nationally.

Although some people chose not to answer the census's question about religious affiliation, 49.3% had no religion, 39.1% were Christian, 0.3% had Māori religious beliefs, 1.3% were Hindu, 0.7% were Muslim, 0.5% were Buddhist and 1.2% had other religions.

Of those at least 15 years old, 465 (19.5%) people had a bachelor's or higher degree, and 501 (21.0%) people had no formal qualifications. The median income was $29,200, compared with $31,800 nationally. 399 people (16.7%) earned over $70,000 compared to 17.2% nationally. The employment status of those at least 15 was that 1,029 (43.1%) people were employed full-time, 369 (15.5%) were part-time, and 105 (4.4%) were unemployed.

Education
Merrilands School is a coeducational contributing primary (years 1–6) school with a roll of  students as of  The school was established in 1960.

Shopping
There is one main shopping centre located in Merrilands. This is located on the corner of Cumberland St and Mangorei Rd. Shops there include Lotto and Post Shop, New World Supermarket, pharmacy, hair salon, dentist, medical centre, along with a Z fuel station. A smaller group of shops, including a dairy and bakery, are at the intersection of Mangorei Rd and Karaka St.

There is one pub in Merrilands called Stumble Inn, which often has live music and hosts a range of musicians.

Notes

External links
 Merrilands School website

Suburbs of New Plymouth